Elizaveta Kulichkova was the defending champion, but she participated in the women's qualifying competition where she lost to Petra Martić in the second round. Tereza Mihalíková won the title, defeating Katie Swan in the final, 6–1, 6–4.

Seeds

Draw

Finals

Top half

Section 1

Section 2

Bottom half

Section 3

Section 4

External links 
 Main draw  at ausopen.com
 Main draw at itftennis.com

Girls' Singles
Australian Open, 2015 Girls' Singles